Dave D'Addio (July 13, 1961 – May 29, 2017) was an American football running back in the National Football League. He was drafted by the Detroit Lions in the fourth round of the 1984 NFL Draft.

D'Addio lived in Irvington until 1968 when his family moved to Union, NJ. He played for the UHS Farmers.

He played college football at the University of Maryland.

College statistics

1982: 60 carries for 272 yards and 3 touchdowns. 19 catches for 248 yards and one touchdown.
1983: 46 carries for 213 yards and 5 touchdowns. 20 catches for 208 yards.

References

1961 births
2017 deaths
Detroit Lions players
Maryland Terrapins football players
Players of American football from Newark, New Jersey